"Cease to Exist" is a song written by Charles Manson, rewritten and recorded by the Beach Boys as "Never Learn Not to Love".

Cease to Exist may also refer to:
 "Cease to Exist" (Suicide Silence song), 2014
 "Cease to Exist", a 1989 song by Meat Beat Manifesto from the album Storm the Studio RMXS
 "Cease to Exist", a 1994 song by Cobra Verde from the album Viva la Muerte
 "Cease to Exist", a 1996 song by Earth Crisis from the album Gomorrah's Season Ends
 "Cease to Exist", a 1996 song by Enewetak
 "Cease to Exist", a 1998 song by Tristania from the album Widow's Weeds
 "Cease to Exist", a 2010 song by Rob Zombie from the album Hellbilly Deluxe 2
 Cease To Exist, a 2007 DVD by World Burns to Death